Ordu may refer to:

Places
 Ordu, a city at Black Sea coast in northern Turkey
 Ordu-Baliq, an ancient city and the capital of the first Uyghur Khaganate
 Ordu Province, a province with its central seat Ordu in Turkey

Other uses
 Urdu, an Indo-Aryan language
 Ja Ordu, a village in Qilab Rural District, Alvar-e Garmsiri District, Andimeshk County, Khuzestan
 Eski Ordu Marsi, an Ottoman military march
 Orduspor, a sport club in Ordu, Turkey
 Ordu Boztepe Gondola, an aerial lift line in Ordu, Turkey
 Ordu Giresun Airport,  an airport under construction in Gülyalı town in Ordu Province, Turkey
 Ordu Kabul F.C., a football team in Afghanistan
 Ordu Nefise Akçelik Tunnel, a highway tunnel in Ordu, Turkey
 Ordu University, a university in Ordu, Turkey
 Orda (organization)